Marc Pujol Pons (born 21 August 1982) is an Andorran footballer. He currently plays for UE Engordany in Andorra's Primera Divisió and the Andorra national football team. Pujol has scored in competitive fixtures 4 goals for the Andorra national team.

Career
Pujol played in the UEFA Intertoto Cup for UE Sant Julià against FC Lausanne-Sports (2001) and Coleraine FC (2002).

He finished in third place at Primera Catalana 2000–01, and promotion to Tercera division with Andorra. He also finished in third place at Tercera division group 5 2002–03 with Sant Andreu. He later won the Andorran Supercup 2003 with UE Sant Julià.

Later on, Pujol achieved second place at Tercera Catalana 2010–11 and promoted to Segona Catalana with Andorra. He also attained second place at Segona Catalana 2011–12 and promoted to Primera Catalana with Andorra. He later won Andorra's Primera Divisió 2013–14 with FC Santa Coloma.

International

Pujol played in a match against England at Old Trafford held on 2 September 2006 but had to withdraw shortly after the start of the second half due to a leg injury after a tangle with Ashley Cole.

National team statistics

International goals
Scores and results list Andorra's goal tally first.

References

External links
Pujol's profile on FIFA.com

1982 births
Living people
Andorran footballers
Andorra international footballers
FC Andorra players
UE Figueres footballers
CF Balaguer footballers
UE Sant Julià players
FC Santa Coloma players
Association football midfielders
FC Santboià players
Andorran expatriate footballers
Expatriate footballers in Spain
Andorran expatriate sportspeople in Spain
Tercera División players
Primera Divisió players
CE Manresa players
FIFA Century Club